Intrusive Spur is a rock spur along the north front of the Jones Mountains, Antarctica,  west of Avalanche Ridge. It was mapped by the University of Minnesota Jones Mountains Party in 1960–61, and was so named by them because the intrusive complex of the basement rocks of the Jones Mountains is well exposed on the spur.

See also
 Mountains in Antarctica

References

Mountains of Ellsworth Land